Corybas dentatus, commonly known as the Lofty Ranges helmet orchid, is a species of terrestrial orchid endemic to South Australia. It has a more or less round leaf and a single purplish and green flower. It is only known from two locations and is listed as "vulnerable" under the Environment Protection and Biodiversity Conservation Act.

Description 
The leaf is green on the upper surface and silvery green on the lower side. It is pinkish grey with dark purple markings and forms a hood over the labellum. Flowering occurs in July and August.

Taxonomy 
Corybas dentatus was first formally described in 1991 by David Jones from a specimen collected in the Sandy Crrek Conservation Park and the description was published in Australian Orchid Research. The specific epithet (dentatus) is a Latin word meaning "toothed" or "pointed", referring to the prominent teeth on the edges of the labellum.

In 2002, David Jones and Mark Clements proposed splitting Corybas into smaller genera and placing this species into Corysanthes but the change has not been widely accepted.

Distribution and habitat
The Lofty Ranges helmet orchid grows in open forest and woodland with low shrubs and ferns. It is known from two populations, the larger of which is in the Sandy Creek Conservation Park.

Conservation
Corybas dentatus is classified as "vulnerable" under the Australian Government Environment Protection and Biodiversity Conservation Act 1999. The main threats to the species are road and track maintenance, weed invasion, herbicide spraying and population fragmentation.

References 

dentatus
Endemic orchids of Australia
Orchids of South Australia
Plants described in 1991